Harvest is a 1936 Austrian romance film directed by Géza von Bolváry and starring Paula Wessely, Attila Hörbiger, and Artúr Somlay. It is also known by the alternative title Die Julika.

Cast

External links

1936 films
Austrian romance films
1930s German-language films
Films directed by Géza von Bolváry
1930s romance films
Austrian black-and-white films